State Route 32 (SR 32) is a  state highway that travels west-to-east through portions of Terrell, Lee, Worth, Turner, Irwin, Coffee, Bacon, Pierce, Brantley, and Glynn counties in the southern part of the U.S. state of Georgia. The highway connects Dawson with Sterling, via Leesburg, Ashburn, Fitzgerald, Douglas, and Alma.

Route description

Dawson to Sycamore
SR 32 begins at an intersection with SR 45/SR 520 in Dawson, within Terrell County. Approximately  later, it meets the western terminus of SR 118 (Crawford Street NE). Then, it leaves town, heading east. On the eastern city limits is Chickasawhatchee Cemetery. Farther to the east is Bethel Cemetery. After the highway enters Lee County, it curves to the south-southeast. Then, it gradually curves to the southeast. Just before entering Leesburg, SR 32 curves to the northeast, crosses over Kinchafoonee Creek, and then curves to the east. In town, it intersects US 19 Byp./SR 3 Byp. At this intersection, US 19 Byp./SR 3 Byp. meet their southern terminus, and SR 32 travels to the north, concurrent with US 19/SR 3. At 4th Street East, SR 32 departs the concurrency to the east northeast. One block later, it meets the southern terminus of SR 195 (Leslie Highway). At this intersection, it turns to the south-southeast and curves to the east. Just before leaving town, the highway passes Leesburg Cemetery. Farther to the east, it crosses over Muckalee Creek. Then, it meets the northern terminus of SR 91 before crossing over the Flint River into Worth County. Just under  into the county, it intersects SR 300 (Georgia–Florida Parkway). It curves southeast to an intersection with SR 313 in Doles. Continuing to the southeast, it intersects SR 33. Just over  later, it enters Turner County. The highway curves back to the northeast and enters Ashburn. In the city, it intersects SR 112 (West Washington Street). The two highways begin a concurrency to the main part of the city. At the intersection with US 41/SR 7, SR 112 continues to the northeast, while SR 32 turns right onto US 41/SR 7. The three highways head concurrent into Sycamore. Just outside Ashburn, they pass the Turner County Airport.

Sycamore to Sterling

In Sycamore, SR 32 splits off to the east-northeast and immediately meets the eastern terminus of SR 32 Conn. Just to the east is an interchange with Interstate 75 (I-75). Then, it passes Pleasant Hill Cemetery and curves to the east. After that, it passes Bethel Cemetery and curves again to the southeast. Later on, it curves to the east-northeast and enters Irwin County a short distance later. SR 32 curves to the northeast and begins a concurrency with SR 125 (Waterloo Highway). The two highways head northeast over the Alapaha River, pass Burton Lake, Oak Grove Cemetery, and Brown Lake, before traveling through Irwinville. At Hogan Lake, SR 32 departs to the southeast and enters Ocilla. In the western part of the city, it intersects US 319/SR 35. The three highways travel concurrently into the main part of the city. They have an intersection with US 129/SR 11/SR 90 (Irwin Avenue). At this intersection, SR 35 reaches its northern terminus, while US 319 turns left onto US 129/SR 11/SR 90, and SR 32 continues to the east. Along its routing, it crosses over the Willacoochee River, curves to the east-southeast, and enters Coffee County. South-southwest of Ambrose, the highway has an intersection with both the northern terminus of SR 149 and the southern terminus of SR 268. SR 32 continues to the southeast, traveling through rural areas of the county and enters Douglas. There, it intersects SR 206 (Bowens Mill Road). Then, it intersects US 441/SR 31 in the main part of the city. Just before leaving Douglas, it intersects US 221/SR 135 (Bowens Mill Road SE). About  later, the highway passes General Coffee State Park and crosses over 17 Mile River. It travels through Nicholls and curves to the northeast into Bacon County. The highway heads northeast and curves to the east to enter Alma. There, it intersects SR 4 Alt. (Dixon Street). A few blocks later, in the main part of town, it intersects US 1/SR 4 (Pierce Street). The highway travels one block north of Rose Hill Cemetery. It travels to the east and curves to the southeast just before intersecting SR 203 in New Lacy. The two highways have a very brief concurrency to the southeast. Continuing southeast, it enters Pierce County. SR 32 travels through Mershon and enters Bristol, where it intersects SR 15/SR 121. Farther to the southeast, in Patterson, is an intersection with US 84/SR 38. The highway crosses over the Little Satilla River into Brantley County. In Hortense, it intersects US 301/SR 23, then proceeds to Needmore, where it meets the northern terminus of SR 110. It curves to the southeast and enters Glynn County. In Anguilla, it begins a concurrency with SR 99. The two highways curve to the northeast, curve back to the east, and enter Sterling. There, they intersect US 25/US 341/SR 27. At this intersection, SR 32 meets its eastern terminus, while SR 99 continues to the east.

National Highway System
The entire length of SR 32 is part of the National Highway System, a system of routes determined to be the most important for the nation's economy, mobility, and defense.

History

1920s
SR 32 was established at least as early as 1919 from SR 1 in Cuthbert east-southeast to Dawson, southeast to Albany, east-southeast to Sylvester, northeast to Ashburn, east-southeast to the approximate location of Nicholls, and east-northeast to SR 15 in Alma. By the end of September 1921, the western terminus was truncated to SR 7 in Sycamore. The former path of SR 32 from Cuthbert to Sylvester was redesignated as SR 50. SR 32 was established on a segment from SR 27 in Baxley east-northeast and north-northwest to SR 23 in the southeastern part of Reidsville, with the Alma–Baxley segment in-between proposed. By October 1926, US 41 was designated on SR 7 in Sycamore. US 1 was designated on SR 32 on the then-completed Alma–Baxley segment. By October 1929, the eastern terminus of SR 32 was truncated to US 1/SR 4 in Alma.

1930s to 2000s
In February 1934, the eastern terminus of SR 32 was extended east-southeast and southeast to SR 38 in Patterson. In the first quarter of 1937, the eastern terminus was extended again, east-southeast to US 341/SR 27 in Sterling. At the end of 1940, the western terminus was extended north-northwest on US 41/SR 7 to Ashburn and then west-northwest to Dawson. In the second quarter of 1941, the crossing of the Flint River, east of Leesburg, was indicated to have "no bridge or ferry". Between June 1955 and July 1957, this crossing was no longer indicated to have not bridge or ferry. The entire length of SR 32 was paved. In 1993, a western bypass of Leesburg, designated as SR 910, was proposed from US 19/SR 3, where they met SR 32 just south of the city to US 19/SR 3 north-northwest of it. In 1998, SR 3 Byp. was established on the proposed path of SR 910, including the concurrency with SR 32. In 2007, US 19 Byp. was established on the paths of SR 3 Byp. and SR 32 in Leesburg.

Major intersections

Special routes

Leesburg truck route

State Route 32 Truck (SR 32 Truck) is a  truck route of SR 32 that directs truck traffic from the main part of Leesburg. It begins at an intersection with US 19/SR 3/SR 32 (Walnut Street) in the south-central part of the city. This intersection is also the southern terminus of US 19 Byp./SR 3 Byp. (Dawson Road). It travels due east on Robert B. Lee Drive. It passes a U.S. Post Office and crosses over some railroad tracks of Norfolk Southern Railway and then enters a rural area of the city. The truck route passes Lee County Elementary School before intersecting Lovers Lane Road. At this intersection, it leaves the city limits of Leesburg and turns left to a due north direction. It continues to the north until it meets its eastern terminus, a second intersection with SR 32 east of Leesburg. Here, the roadway continues as Old Stage Road.

Sycamore connector route

State Route 32 Connector (SR 32 Conn.) is a  connector route that exists entirely within the city limits of Sycamore, in the south-central part of Turner County.

It begins at an intersection with US 41/SR 7 (East Railroad Avenue). It travels in a northeasterly direction until it meets its eastern terminus, an intersection with the SR 32 mainline (Jefferson Davis Highway). Due to the format to the intersection of US 41/SR 7 and the SR 32 mainline, SR 32 Conn. is an easier way for drivers to travel from US 41/SR 7 north to SR 32 east and from SR 32 west to US 41/SR 7 south.

Between the beginning of 1950 and the beginning of 1968, SR 32 Conn. was established on its current path.

Douglas truck route

State Route 32 Truck (SR 32 Truck) is a truck route around Douglas traveling south of mainline SR 32. It is named Bowen Mill Road Southwest, and Bowen Mill Road Southeast.

SR 32 Truck begins at an intersection with the SR 32 mainline (Ocilla Road/West Ward Street). This intersection is also the northern terminus of SR 158 Truck. SR 32 Truck/SR 158 Truck travel south-southwest, concurrent with US 221 Truck/US 441 Truck/SR 31 Truck/SR 135 Truck/SR 206. The seven highways cross over some railroad tracks of CSX on the Hero Bridge. Northwest of a Walmart distribution center, they curve to the south-southeast. They intersect SR 158 (Baker Highway) and then curve to the east-southeast. They intersect SR 135 (Willacoochee Road). Here, SR 135 Truck reaches its southern terminus. At an intersection with US 221/US 441/SR 31 (Peterson Avenue), US 221 Truck, US 441 Truck, SR 31 Truck, and SR 135 Truck reach their southern terminus, while SR 206 reaches its eastern terminus. Also US 221 joins the concurrency. The highways curve to the north-northeast and have another intersection with SR 158 (East Baker Highway). They cross over the CSX railroad tracks again before curving to the northwest. A short distance later, they have another intersection with SR 32 (Bowen Mill Road/Ward Street). Here, US 221, SR 32, SR 135, and SR 135 Truck continue to the northwest.

Patterson connector route

State Route 32 Connector (SR 32 Conn.) was a short-lived connector route of SR 32 that existed entirely within the central part of the city limits of Patterson. Between the beginning of 1952 and the beginning of 1974, it was established from SR 32 northeast and northwest to US 82/SR 38. By the beginning of 1979, it was decommissioned.

See also

References

External links

 
 Georgia Roads (Routes 21 - 40)
 Georgia State Route 32 on State-Ends.com

032
Transportation in Terrell County, Georgia
Transportation in Lee County, Georgia
Transportation in Worth County, Georgia
Transportation in Turner County, Georgia
Transportation in Irwin County, Georgia
Transportation in Coffee County, Georgia
Transportation in Bacon County, Georgia
Transportation in Pierce County, Georgia
Transportation in Brantley County, Georgia
Transportation in Glynn County, Georgia